Rostworowski is a Polish noble surname, it may refer to:
 Emanuel Rostworowski, Polish historian
 Karol Hubert Rostworowski, Polish playwright
 María Rostworowski, Peruvian historian
 Michał Jan Rostworowski, Polish lawyer
 Tadeusz Maria Rostworowski, Polish architect